Scalping is the act of cutting or tearing a part of the human scalp, with hair attached, from the head, and generally occurred in warfare with the scalp being a trophy. Scalp-taking is considered part of the broader cultural practice of the taking and display of human body parts as trophies, and may have developed as an alternative to the taking of human heads, for scalps were easier to take, transport, and preserve for subsequent display. Scalping independently developed in various cultures in both the Old and New Worlds.

Europe
One of the earliest examples of scalping dates back to the mesolithic period, found at a hunter-gatherer cemetery in Sweden. Several human remains from the stone-age Ertebølle culture in Denmark show evidence of scalping. A man found in a grave in the Alvastra pile-dwelling in Sweden had been scalped approximately 5,000 years ago.

Georg Frederici noted that “Herodotus provided the only clear and satisfactory portrayal of a scalping people in the old world” in his description of the Scythians, a nomadic people then located to the north and west of the Black Sea. Herodotus related that Scythian warriors would behead the enemies they defeated in battle and present the heads to their king to claim their share of the plunder. Then, the warrior would skin the head “by making a circular cut round the ears and shaking out the skull; he then scrapes the flesh off the skin with the rib of an ox, and when it is clean works it with his fingers until it is supple, and fit to be used as a sort of handkerchief. He hangs these handkerchiefs on the bridle of his horse, and is very proud of them. The best man is the man who has the greatest number.”

Ammianus Marcellinus noted the taking of scalps by the Alani in terms quite similar to those used by Herodotus. The Abbé Emmanuel H. D. Domenech referred to the decalvare of the ancient Germans and the capillos et cutem detrahere of the code of the Visigoths as examples of scalping in early medieval Europe, though some more recent interpretations of these terms relate them to shaving off the hair of the head as a legal punishment rather than scalping.

In England in 1036,  Earl Godwin, father of Harold Godwinson, was reportedly responsible for scalping his enemies, among whom was Alfred Aetheling. According to the ancient Abingdon manuscript, 'some of them were blinded, some maimed, some scalped. No more horrible deed was done in this country since the Danes came and made peace here'.

In 1845, mercenary John Duncan observed what he estimated to be 700 scalps taken in warfare and displayed as trophies by a contingent of female soldiers—Dahomey Amazons—employed by the King of Dahomey (present-day Republic of Benin). Duncan noted that these would have been taken and kept over a long period of time and would not have come from a single battle. Although Duncan travelled widely in Dahomey, and described customs such as the taking of heads and the retention of skulls as trophies, nowhere else does he mention scalping.

Occasional instances of scalping of dead Axis troops by Allied military personnel are known from World War II.  While many of these instances took place in the Pacific Theater, along with more extreme forms of trophy-hunting (see American mutilation of Japanese war dead), occasional instances are reported in the European Theater as well.  One particularly widely reported, although disputed, case involves that of German general Friedrich Kussin, the commandant of the town of Arnhem who was ambushed and killed by British paratroopers in early stages of Operation Market Garden.

Asia 
There is physical evidence that scalping was practiced during the Longshan and Erlitou periods in China's central plain.

A skull from an Iron Age cemetery in South Siberia shows evidence of scalping. It lends physical evidence to the practice of scalp taking by the Scythians living there.

Some evidence is also found in the Indian Subcontinent. Bhai Taru Singh (
– 1 July 1745) was a prominent Sikh martyr known for sacrificing his life, in the name of protecting Sikh values, by having had his head scalped rather than cutting his hair and converting to Islam.

Americas

Techniques
Specific scalping techniques varied somewhat from place to place, depending on the cultural patterns of the scalper regarding the desired shape, size, and intended use of the severed scalp, and on how the victims wore their hair, but the general process of scalping was quite uniform.  The scalper firmly grasped the hair of a subdued adversary, made several quick semicircular cuts with a sharp instrument on either side of the area to be taken, and then vigorously yanked at the nearly-severed scalp. The scalp separated from the skull along the plane of the areolar connective tissue, the fourth (and least substantial) of the five layers of the human scalp. Scalping was not in itself fatal, though it was most commonly inflicted on the gravely wounded or the dead. The earliest instruments used in scalping were stone knives crafted of flint, chert, or obsidian, or other materials like reeds or oyster shells that could be worked to carry an edge equal to the task. Collectively, such tools were also used for a variety of everyday tasks like skinning and processing game, but were replaced by metal knives acquired in trade through European contact. The implement, often referred to as a “scalping knife” in popular American and European literature, was not known as such by Native Americans, a knife being for them just a simple and effective multi-purpose utility tool for which scalping was but one of many uses.

Intertribal conflict

There is substantial archaeological evidence of scalping in North America in the pre-Columbian era. Carbon dating of skulls show evidence of scalping as early as 600 AD; some skulls show evidence of healing from scalping injuries, suggesting at least some victims occasionally survived at least several months. Among Plains Indians, it seems to have been practiced primarily as part of intertribal warfare, with scalps only taken of enemies killed in battle. However, author and historian Mark van de Logt wrote, "Although military historians tend to reserve the concept of 'total war, in which civilians are targeted, "for conflicts between modern industrial nations," the term "closely approaches the state of affairs between the Pawnees, the Sioux, and the Cheyennes. Noncombatants were legitimate targets. Indeed, the taking of a scalp of a woman or child was considered honorable because it signified that the scalp taker had dared to enter the very heart of the enemy's territory."

Many tribes of Native Americans practiced scalping, in some instances up until the end of the 19th century. Of the approximately 500 bodies at the Crow Creek massacre site, 90 percent of the skulls show evidence of scalping. The event took place circa 1325 AD. European colonisation of the Americas increased the incidence of intertribal conflict, and consequently an increase in the prevalence of scalping.

Colonial wars

The Connecticut and Massachusetts colonies offered bounties for the heads of killed Indians, and later for just their scalps, during the Pequot War in the 1630s; Connecticut specifically reimbursed Mohegans for slaying the Pequot in 1637. Four years later, the Dutch in New Amsterdam offered bounties for the heads of Raritans. In 1643, the Iroquois attacked a group of Huron pelters and French carpenters near Montreal, killing and scalping three of the French.

Bounties for Indian captives or their scalps appeared in the legislation of the American colonies during the Susquehannock War (1675–77). New England offered bounties to white settlers and Narragansett people in 1675 during King Philip's War. By 1692, New France also paid their native allies for scalps of their enemies. In 1697, on the northern frontier of Massachusetts colony, settler Hannah Duston killed ten of her Abenaki captors during her nighttime escape, presented their ten scalps to the Massachusetts General Assembly, and was rewarded with bounties for two men, two women, and six children, even though Massachusetts had rescinded the law authorizing scalp bounties six months earlier. There were six colonial wars with New England and the Iroquois Confederacy fighting New France and the Wabanaki Confederacy over a 75-year period, starting with King William's War in 1688. All sides scalped victims, including noncombatants, during this frontier warfare. Bounty policies originally intended only for Native American scalps were extended to enemy colonists.

Massachusetts created a scalp bounty during King William's War in July 1689, and continued doing so during Queen Anne's War in 1703. During Father Rale's War (1722–1725), on August 8, 1722, Massachusetts put a bounty on native families, paying 100 pounds sterling for the scalps of male Indians aged 12 and over, and 50 pounds sterling for women and children. Ranger John Lovewell is known to have conducted scalp-hunting expeditions, the most famous being the Battle of Pequawket in New Hampshire.

In the 1710s and '20s, New France engaged in frontier warfare with the Natchez people and the Meskwaki people, during which both sides would employ the practice. In response to repeated massacres of British families by the French and their native allies during King George's War, Massachusetts governor William Shirley issued a bounty in 1746 to be paid to British-allied Indians for the scalps of French-allied Indian men, women, and children. New York passed a Scalp Act in 1747.

During Father Le Loutre's War and the Seven Years' War in Nova Scotia and Acadia, French colonists offered payments to Indians for British scalps. In 1749, British Governor Edward Cornwallis created an extirpation proclamation, which included a bounty for male scalps or prisoners. Also during the Seven Years' War, Governor of Nova Scotia Charles Lawrence offered a reward for male Mi'kmaq scalps in 1756. (In 2000, some Mi'kmaq  argued that this proclamation was still legal in Nova Scotia. Government officials argued that it was no longer legal because the bounty was superseded by later treaties - see the Halifax Treaties).

During the French and Indian War, as of June 12, 1755, Massachusetts governor William Shirley was offering a bounty of £40 for a male Indian scalp, and £20 for scalps of females or of children under 12 years old.  In 1756, Pennsylvania Lieutenant Governor Robert Morris, in his Declaration of War against the Lenni Lenape (Delaware) people, offered "130 Pieces of Eight, for the Scalp of Every Male Indian Enemy, above the Age of Twelve Years," and "50 Pieces of Eight for the Scalp of Every Indian Woman, produced as evidence of their being killed."

Although much has been made of the existence of scalp bounties, generally because they have been easily accessible as statutes, little research exists on the numbers of bounties actually paid.  Early frontier warfare in forested areas in the era of flintlock muzzle-loading rifles favored tomahawks and knives over firearms because of the long loading time after a shot was fired.  Advantage was clearly held by bow, knife, and hatchet.  Some states had a history of escalating the payout of bounties offered per scalp, presumably because lower bounties were ineffective and were not worth risking one's life in exchange for the payoff.  Rising bounties were a measure of bounty system failure.

American Revolution
In the American Revolutionary War, Henry Hamilton, the British Lieutenant Governor and Superintendent of Indian Affairs at Fort Detroit, was known by American Patriots as the "hair-buyer general" because they believed he encouraged and paid his Native American allies to scalp American settlers. As a result, when Hamilton was captured, he was treated as a war criminal instead of a prisoner of war. However, American historians have noted that there was no proof that he had ever offered rewards for scalps, and it is now believed that no British officer paid for scalps during the American Revolution.

Moses Younglove, a surgeon for General Herkimer's Brigade during the Battle of Oriskany (1777), was taken prisoner by the Tories during the battle and suffered torture at the hands of both the Tories and Iroquois. Younglove recorded at least two incidents of American prisoners being cannibalized during the Sullivan Expedition.

The September 13, 1779 journal entry of Lieutenant William Barton tells of patriots participating in scalping.
 It is well established that the Iroquois, allied to the British during the American Revolution, practiced scalping. The most famous case was that of Jane McCrea, whose fiancé was a Loyalist officer. She was abducted by Iroquois, loyal to the British and under the command of John Burgoyne, and ultimately scalped and shot. Her death inspired many colonists to join the fight against the British invasion from Canada, an effort which ended in defeat at the Battle of Saratoga.

Mexico
In 1835, the government of the Mexican state of Sonora put a bounty on the Apache which, over time, evolved into a payment by the government of 100 pesos for each scalp of a male 14 or more years old. In 1837, the Mexican state of Chihuahua also offered a bounty on Apache scalps, 100 pesos per warrior, 50 pesos per woman, and 25 pesos per child. Harris Worcester wrote: "The new policy attracted a diverse group of men, including Anglos, runaway slaves led by Seminole John Horse, and Indians — Kirker used Delawares and Shawnees; others, such as Terrazas, used Tarahumaras; and Seminole Chief Coacoochee led a band of his own people who had fled from Indian Territory."

American Civil War
Some scalping incidents occurred during the American Civil War of 1861-1865. For example, Confederate guerrillas led by "Bloody Bill" Anderson were well known for decorating their saddles with the scalps of Union soldiers they had killed.  Archie Clement had the reputation of being Anderson's “chief scalper”.

Continued Indian Wars
In 1851, the U.S. Army displayed Indian scalps in Stanislaus County, California. 

In 1851, the Tehama Massacre occurred in Tehama County, California, wherein U.S. military and citizens razed villages and scalped hundreds of men, women, and children. This attack targeted Native communities specifically, in the villages of Yana, Konkow, Nisenan, Wintu, Nomlaki, Patwin, Yuki, and Maidu.

Scalping also occurred during the Sand Creek Massacre on November 29, 1864, during the American Indian Wars, when a 700-man force of U.S. Army volunteers destroyed the village of Cheyenne and Arapaho in southeastern Colorado Territory, killing and mutilating an estimated 70–163 Native American civilians. An 1867 New York Times article reported that "settlers in a small town in Colorado Territory had recently subscribed $5,000 to a fund ‘for the purpose of buying Indian scalps (with $25 each to be paid for scalps with the ears on)’ and that the market for Indian scalps ‘is not affected by age or sex’." The article noted this behavior was "sanctioned" by the U.S. federal government, and was modeled on patterns the U.S. had begun a century earlier in the "American East".

From one writer's point of view, it was a "uniquely American" innovation that the use of scalp bounties in the wars against indigenous societies "became an indiscriminate killing process that deliberately targeted Indian non-combatants (including women, children, and infants), as well as warriors." Some American states such as Arizona paid bounty for enemy Native American scalps.

Image gallery

See also
Pitchcapping
Shrunken head

References

Bibliography

External links

 

American frontier
Native American history
Human trophy collecting
War trophies
Military history of Acadia
Military history of Europe
Military history of New England
Military history of the Thirteen Colonies
Military history of Canada
Punishments
Torture
Scalp
Western (genre) staples and terminology

pt:Escalpelamento
sr:Скалп